Nii Lante Okunka Blankson, professionally known as Knii Lante, is a Ghanaian reggae, soul, and Afro pop musician, songwriter, and medical doctor from Accra, Ghana.

Early life and education
Knii Lante is a medical doctor who has a degree in BSC Human Biology, MBCHB and MWACP. He started his music career when he was still in medical school.

Music career
Knii Lante's career in music started when he featured on fellow reggae musician Blakk Rasta's song titled "Obama". He also featured on Micheal Dwamena's song titled "Ngozi" which won an award for collaboration of the year at the Ghana Music Awards in 2007/2008. He is a composer who plays the piano and guitar.

He has two albums out: Love & Revolution, and True Feelings which featured Queen Ifrica and Cherine Anderson among others. He has also worked with producers Dean Fraser and Mikie Bennett.

Tours and performances
Knii Lante has performed at Felabration organised at The Shrine and at Freedom Park Victoria Island in Lagos, Nigeria. He released his second album True Feelings at the Redbones Blue Cafe in Kingston, Jamaica. He has also performed at Rebel Salute in Jamaica, MASA 2018 in Côte d'Ivoire, Chale Wote Festival in Ghana, Kuchoko Festival 2018 in Ghana, and the Accra Jazz Festival in Ghana.

Awards
Best Male Vocalists Ghana Music Award 2011.
Best Music Video of the Year Vodafone Ghana Music Awards 2014.
Best Male Vocalist at the Bass Awards 2017.

Discography

Singles

Albums

References

External links

 

Ghanaian musicians
Living people
Year of birth missing (living people)